"Mars" is the debut single by English electronic musician Fake Blood.

Critical reception
Mother Jones ranked "Mars" at #5 on "The Best Singles of 2008" list.

Chart performance
"Mars" became Fake Blood's first single to chart on the Belgian Dance Chart. It peaked at No. 3 and spent a total of 23 weeks on the chart. The single also became Fake Blood's first single on the Dutch Singles Chart, where it peaked at No. 40 and spent a total of 4 weeks on the chart. It received a lot of airplay on the Dutch radio station 3FM.

Track listing
Mars single
 "Mars (Radio Edit)" – 2:59
 "Mars" – 4:23
 "Blood Splashing (Fake Blood Theme)" – 4:25

Mars - Remixes
 "Mars (Jack Beats Remix)" – 5:25
 "Mars (Style of Eye's Edit to Debit)" – 8:40
 "Mars (Boy 8 Bit Remix)" – 5:55

Charts

References

2008 songs
2008 debut singles
Fake Blood songs
PIAS Recordings singles